Kahalgaon (formerly known as Colgong during British rule) is a town and a municipality in Bhagalpur district in the state of Bihar, India. It is located close to the Vikramashila, that was once a famous centre of Buddhist learning across the world, along with Nalanda during the Pala dynasty. The Kahalgaon Super Thermal Power Plant (KhSTPP) is located near the town(3 km).

How to reach Kahalgaon

By air 

The nearest airport is Patna Airport which is 260 km away. From Patna regular flights are available for major Indian cities Delhi, Kolkata, Mumbai and Bangalore. Alternatively, one may come to Kolkata Airport. This route is generally preferred by one travelling from southern or western part of country.

By train 

Kahalgaon railway station, one of the oldest station of Bihar, serves the Howrah–Kiul loop line. The city is situated on the broad-gauge loop line of Eastern Railway. Kahalgaon is well connected to all cities by train.

By road 

Kahalgaon is connected by a network of national and state highways, along with district and rural roads. National Highway 80 (NH 80) runs from the Mokama–Farakka via Bhagalpur, Kahalgaon. It links directly with Patna, via Begusarai and Khagaria.

Demographics 
, Kahalgaon had a population of 22,110. Male constitute 53% of the population and female 47%. Kahalgaon has an average literacy rate of 57%, lower than the national average of 59.5%: male literacy is 63% and, female literacy is 50%. In Kahalgaon, 17% of the population is under 6 years of age.
Angika is the local dialect and is spoken by majority. Hindi, Urdu, and English are also spoken by different section of the population.

The Kahalgaon Nagar Panchayat has population of 33,700 of which 17,952 are males while 15,748 are females as per report released by Census India 2011.

Population of Children with age of 0-6 is 5221 which is 15.49% of total population of Kahalgaon Nagar Panchyat(NP). In Kahalgaon Nagar Panchayat, Female Sex Ratio is of 877 against state average of 918. Moreover, Child Sex Ratio in Kahalgaon is around 922 compared to Bihar state average of 935. Literacy rate of Kahalgaon city is 76.81% higher than state average of 61.80%. In Kahalgaon, Male literacy is around 81.64% while female literacy rate is 71.26%.

Kahalgaon Nagar Panchayat has total administration over 6,315 houses to which it supplies basic amenities like water and sewerage. It is also authorize to build roads within Nagar Panchayat limits and impose taxes on properties coming under its jurisdiction.

History 
Vikramashila: Close to Kahalgaon are the remains of the great Vikramashila Mahavihara, which was famous as a center of advanced learning across the world in ancient times.
Mahmud Shah's Tomb: Kahalgaon also houses the Tomb of Mahmud Shah, the last independent king of erstwhile Bengal, who died here a few days after his army was defeated by Sher Shah.
The SSV college, which is a degree college, was the main stock center of business of indigo(Nil, used for white cloth) at the time of British rule in India.

Premedieval era
Kahalgaon is named after Kahol Rishi, the father of the saint named Ashtavakra (popularly known in the Mahabharata). Ashtavakra was one of the greatest saints who got his body Vakara from eight places so was named as Ashtavakra. He set free his father from jail of the king by winning the a contest on Shastra.

Medieval era
Kahalgaon was the education hub in the Middle Ages. Vikramashila was one of the two most important centers of Buddhist learning in India, along with Nalanda during the Pala dynasty. Vikramashila was established by King Dharmapala (rule: 770–810 CE) in response to a supposed decline in the quality of scholarship at Nālandā. Atisha, the renowned Pandita, is sometimes listed as a notable abbot.

Modern era
In the vicinity of the town, now stands the thermal power project from NTPC, known as KhSTPP. The project has an installed capacity of 2340 MW developed in two stages. The first stage had 4 units of 210 MW capacity each and the second expansion had 3 units of 500 MW.

The arrival of NTPC in the town, marked the arrival of world-class infrastructure, healthcare and education, which would have taken years to reach to people otherwise. Kahalgaon now enjoys the luxury of the best. Education has taken a front-runner in the normal routine and the setup has also created enough jobs and businesses around itself. The townships of NTPC are wonderfully planned, with lush greenery. It has parks, shopping complexes, clubhouses, stadiums and transit camps apart from housing for employees. The peace that Kahalgaon has is remarkable.

NTPC Kahalgaon 
The National Thermal Power Corporation, popularly known as NTPC was also set up in Kahalgaon in the year 1985, the unit has been named Kahalgaon Super Thermal Power Plant (KhSTPP) owing to its relatively large production capacity. The total installed capacity of the plant is 2340 megawatts, Stage-I: 840 MW and Stage-II: 1500 MW.

NTPC power plant uses Rajmahal Coal Fields of Eastern Coalfields Limited (Lalmatiya) as the coal source for producing electricity. The river Ganges serves as a major source of water needed for production. Normally PLF is about 70% here because of lack of coal. It has 4x210 MW units of Russian make and 3x500 MW units of German make supplied by BHEL. This power plant serves as a beneficiary for West Bengal, Bihar, Jharkhand, Orissa, Sikkim states.

In Art and Literature
An anonymous tomb on some rocks on the Ganga River nearby is the subject of a painting by J. M. W. Turner (Rocks at Colgong on the Ganges), an engraving of which, together with a poetical illustration by Letitia Elizabeth Landon was published in Fisher's Drawing Room Scrap Book, 1839.

Tourism

Vikramashila Mahavihara

Vikramashila (vill-Antichak) is located 13 km from Kahalgaon. It is famous for ancient Vikramashila, founded by Dharmapala, a Pala King, in the 8th century, the educational institution served as a learning center of Tantric Buddhism. At the center of the building was a huge Buddhist temple, surrounded by 108 smaller temples. The remains excavated from this university made Vikramashila one of the most important historic places near Kahalgaon.
It produced eminent scholars who were often invited by foreign countries to spread Buddhist learning, culture and religion. The most distinguished and eminent among all was Atisa Dipankara, the founder of Lamaism in Tibet. Subjects like theology, philosophy, grammar, metaphysics, and logic were taught here but the most important branch of learning was tantrism.

Baba Bateshwar Nath Temple

It is situated on the banks of river Ganges and near to Vikramshila .This temple is an ancient Shiva temple with lots of devotees coming here in shravan month.

Tapas Dham temple/Shantibaba Temple

It is situated amid of Ganga River, 500 m away from the bank of the river.
shiva shiv temple/NTPC camps
tapas dham

Shiv Kumari Mountain 
Shiv Kumari Mountain is mainly divided in two parts - the small Mountain and big Mountain, there is a mosque on the big Mountain and there is a Shiva temple on the small Mountain. This mountain is located in the east direction of Kahalgaon Railway Station. This is the highest mountain of Kahalgaon.

References 

Cities and towns in Bhagalpur district